The 2020 Final Resolution was a professional wrestling event produced by Impact Wrestling and the 11th edition in the Final Resolution chronology. It took place on December 12, 2020 at Skyway Studios in Nashville, Tennessee and aired exclusively on Impact Plus.

Nine matches were contested at the event. In the main event, Rich Swann successfully defended the Impact World Championship against Chris Bey. In other prominent matches, Deonna Purrazzo defeated Rosemary to retain the Impact Knockouts Championship and Manik defeated Rohit Raju to win the Impact X Division Championship.

Production

Background
In 2013, Impact Wrestling (then known as Total Nonstop Action Wrestling) discontinued monthly pay-per-view events in favor of the pre-recorded One Night Only events. Final Resolution was produced as a PPV from 2005 to 2012. On November 14, 2020, it was revived as a monthly special for Impact Plus, with that year's event taking place on December 12 at the Skyway Studios in Nashville, Tennessee.

Storylines
The event featured professional wrestling matches that involve different wrestlers from pre-existing scripted feuds and storylines. Wrestlers portrayed villains, heroes, or less distinguishable characters in scripted events that build tension and culminate in a wrestling match or series of matches.

On the December 1 episode of Impact, Willie Mack defeated Chris Bey in a singles match. Following the match, Moose, who previously defeated Mack in a No Disqualification match on the November 17 episode, attacked Mack, prompting Mack's ally, the Impact World Champion Rich Swann to make the save. Bey then performed the Art of Finesse on Swann following Moose's attack. After the incident, Impact announced that Swann will defend his title against Bey at Final Resolution.

At Turning Point, The Good Brothers (Doc Gallows and Karl Anderson) defeated The North (Ethan Page and Josh Alexander) to win the World Tag Team Championship. On the November 24 episode of Impact!, Page revealed that he attacked and injured Gallows, ruling him out of action for 4-5 weeks. Later on the episode, Page faced a "phenomenal opponent" chosen by Anderson, which was revealed to be Swoggle dressed as former Impact star and current WWE star AJ Styles, with Swoggle calling himself "The wee-nominal one, AJ Swoggle". Swoggle then defeated Page, leaving Page upset in the middle of the ring. This led to Page challenging Anderson to a match at Final Resolution on the following episode, where if Page won, The North would receive an opportunity to challenge for the tag team titles.

At Turning Point, Deonna Purrazzo defeated Su Yung in a no disqualification match to win the Knockouts Championship for a second time. On the December 8 episode of Impact!, she teamed with Kimber Lee to compete in the Knockouts Tag Team Championship Tournament for the revived titles, but were eliminated in the first round by Rosemary and Taya Valkyrie. Later that night, Purrazzo complained to Impact Executive Vice President Scott D'Amore that she's being overworked, which he doesn't buy and tells her that she will be defending the Knockouts title against Rosemary at Final Resolution.

On the November 10 episode of Impact!, X Division Champion Rohit Raju defeated TJP to retain the title, with the stipulation that TJP could no longer challenge for the X Division Championship, as long as Raju was the champion. On the November 24 episode of Impact!, Raju issued his Defeat Rohit Challenge which was answered by Suicide, but he later made it a non-title match. During the match, he unmasked him thinking it was TJP, but the latter appeared and confused Raju, who was pinned by Crazzy Steve who was under the Suicide guise. The following week, Raju would defeat Steve to successfully retain his title. On the December 8 episode of Impact!, Raju ridiculed TJP for losing his match against Brian Myers, and announced that the final Defeat Rohit Challenge of 2020 will take place at Final Resolution.

On the October 27 episode of Impact!, a wedding took place between John E. Bravo and Rosemary but the lights went out and a gunshot was heard, ending with the lights going back on and Bravo lying down with a gunshot wound and blood on his chest. In early November, Tommy Dreamer conducted an investigation that narrow down the shooter to 10 suspects, all of them passing a lie detector test. A Wrestler's Court took place on the November 24 episode of Impact!, where Larry D's alter-ego "Lawrence D" confessed to shooting Bravo because he took Rosemary away from him. The following, Larry D was confronted by Bravo for shooting him, with Dreamer wanting an explanation for his actions but gets attacked instead. On the December 8 episode of Impact!, he was challenged by Dreamer to a match at Final Resolution, where if Larry D won, he's a free man. But if Dreamer won, he has to go to jail for shooting Bravo.

Event

Preliminary matches
Next, a knockouts tag team match was contested between The Sea Stars (Ashley Vox and Delmi Exo) against Havok and Nevaeh. Delmi takes out Nevaeh with a hurricanrana, who in return hits her with a bulldog for a two count. Ashley tags in and hits Nevaeh with a dropkick, but causes her to fall towards her corner, tagging in Havok. After avoiding a sit-down splash, Ashley tags in Delmi, but gets taken out by Havok and Nevaeh with a backbreaker into a clothesline for two. Havok and Nevaeh utilize quick tags to continue their offense on Delmi, who gets taken out after the former kicks her from the apron into the latter who delivers a German suplex. Delmi gets the tag to Ashley, and the both of them take Havok out with a codebreaker/senton combination, but only for a near fall. Nevaeh tags in to hit Ashley with a sliding cutter to win for her team.

The third match was an intergender tag team match between Tenille Dashwood and Kaleb with a K versus Alisha and Eddie Edwards. Tenille and Alisha have a brief lockup before tagging in their respective partners. Eddie takes out Kaleb with an inverted atomic drop and a belly-to-belly suplex. Kaleb gets the advantage after a leg sweep to work on Eddie in the corner, gets caught with a jawbreaker but trips him into the ropes, allowing Tenille to choke him as Kaleb distracts the referee. Eddie fights back with a "Blue Thunder Bomb" on Kaleb, both of them tag out, and Alisha takes Tenille out with a low flatliner, a running senton and then a bulldog from the corner. Kaleb breaks up the cover and gets sent to the outside, but manages to trip up Alisha and allow Tenille to land a butterfly suplex for two. Alisha heads to the top rope but gets caught in the tree of woe because of Kaleb, leaving her open for Tenille to wrench her neck to bottom turnbuckle and deliver a low crossbody, but manages to kick out at two. Alisha tags in Eddie who gives Kaleb a back body drop, sets him up for the tiger driver but Tenille stops him, and Alisha tags in to deliver a tilt-a-whirl DDT on Kaleb, who then gets hit with a suicide dive by Eddie. As Alisha climbs up top, Sami Callihan's music plays but he doesn't appear, leaving her distracted for Tenille to hit the "Spotlight Kick" and get the win. After the match, Callihan emerges from underneath the ring and hits Eddie's head with a baseball bat, followed by a package piledriver. Callihan attempted to piledrive Alisha, but was stopped by several referees and officials from doing it.

The seventh match was Deonna Purrazzo (accompanied by Kimber Lee) defending the Impact Knockouts Championship against Rosemary (accompanied by Taya Valkyrie). Purrazzo goes outside to console with Lee, but immediately gets hit with a spear once she enters the ring. Rosemary dominates Purrazzo by throwing her across the ring and slamming her head on the mat and turnbuckles for a two count. Purrazzo throws Rosemary to the outside, sends her arm to the post, and continues to target it once back in the ring. Purrazzo attempts to apply the Fujiwara armbar but Rosemary dumps her outside the ring, and then hits the Scorpion Death Drop once she enters the ring for two. After applying the "Upside Down", Rosemary gets knocked off the apron onto the floor by Purrazzo, who hits her with a clothesline in the ring for a two count. Purrazzo applies a rear chin lock and then a modified triangle on Rosemary, who gets out of both holds and gives the former a sidewalk slam. The two trade blows with each other, before Rosemary hits a few clotheslines, a sling blade and an exploder suplex on Purrazzo, but only gets a two. After hitting a butterfly suplex for another two count, Rosemary gets caught in the Fujiwara armbar by Purrazzo, but manages to rise to her feet and deliver the "Red Wedding" for a near fall. Purrazzo gets the pump kick on Rosemary and hits the "Cosa Nostra" to win and retain her title.

Reception
Scott Slimmer of 411Mania was mixed on the event, criticizing the first-half for being "extremely forgettable", but praised the other matches towards the end. He rated it a 6 and wrote that: "Final Resolution ended on a high note, but except for the main event, it was a fairly unremarkable show." Bob Kapur of Slam Wrestling felt the opening undercard had decent matches but were more suitable for TV than on a special event. He praised the second-half for delivering on the action, highlighting the Impact World Title bout for showing "a different side to both" Bey and Swann. Kapur gave the event 4 out of 5 stars and wrote that: "After a shaky start, the matches got better and better as the show went on. While there was little bad about the event (*cough* the softest hardcore match ever), much of the undercard felt just like TV matches but a little longer. Still, the big matches delivered, and the main event was one of the better and more unique performances you'll ever see from either guy."

Results

Notes

References

External links

2020 Impact Plus Monthly Special events
2020 in professional wrestling
2020 in Tennessee
December 2020 sports events in the United States
Events in Nashville, Tennessee
Final Resolution
Professional wrestling in Nashville, Tennessee